Peng Shepherd is an American author.

Her first novel, The Book of M, was released in 2018, followed by The Future Library in 2021 and The Cartographers in 2022. She is a National Endowment for the Arts Fellow.

Early life and education
Peng Shepherd was born and raised in Phoenix, Arizona, a daughter of Lin Sue Cooney, a retired Channel 12 anchor. Peng earned a Bachelor of Arts in Chinese Language and Literature from Arizona State University in 2006. Peng then completed an M.A. in International Studies and Diplomacy, and Chinese Language at the SOAS University of London in 2008. From New York University, she received her M.F.A. in Creative Writing in 2014, where she was a Stein Fellow and a Veterans Fellow, in 2013 and 2014, respectively.

Literary career
Her debut novel The Book of M, a dystopian fantasy, was published by Harper Collins in 2018, and received mainly favorable reviews. Per The Hollywood Reporter, The Book of M was optioned for screen adaptation on television by Liz Sarnoff from Universal Content Productions.

Her other works have been noted and reviewed by various publications and literary critics, including The Washington Post, Kirkus Reviews, Associated Press, The Wall Street Journal, Sun Sentinel, The Guardian, and Chicago Tribune, among others. Vivian Shaw, the editor from the Washington Post, wrote about The Cartographers in her book review: 
 
"Shepherd, also the author of “The Book of M”, nails the sense of deep-seated, profound connection and love between a small group of people drawn together by shared experience and interest, creating an intense familial bond." 

Shepherd is a recipient of a National Endowment for the Arts Fellowship (2020) and the 2019 Neukom Institute Literary Arts Award for "Debut Speculative Fiction" from the Neukom Institute for Computational Science at Dartmouth College. Her books have been translated to French, Polish, Czech, and Turkish, with the translation right sold in Chinese, Arabic, Dutch and Danish.

Bibliography
The Book of M (June 2018), ISBN 9780008225629.
The Future Library (August 2021), ISBN 9781250828675.
The Cartographers (March 2022), ISBN 9780062910721.

Translations
Polish: Księga M (The Book of M).
Czech: Kniha M (The Book of M).
Turkish: The Book of M.
French: Le Livre de M.

References

External links
 Official website
 National Endowment for the Arts - Peng Shepherd

Living people
21st-century American novelists
21st-century American women writers
American fantasy writers
Women science fiction and fantasy writers
Chinese-American literature
New York University alumni
Alumni of SOAS University of London
Arizona State University alumni
Year of birth missing (living people)